is a Japanese former swimmer. He competed in two events at the 1968 Summer Olympics.

References

External links
 

1951 births
Living people
Japanese male freestyle swimmers
Olympic swimmers of Japan
Swimmers at the 1968 Summer Olympics
Sportspeople from Hiroshima
Asian Games medalists in swimming
Asian Games gold medalists for Japan
Asian Games silver medalists for Japan
Swimmers at the 1970 Asian Games
Medalists at the 1970 Asian Games
20th-century Japanese people